The tunnelling mud crab, Austrohelice crassa, is a marine large-eyed crab of the family Grapsidae, endemic to the sea coasts of New Zealand. Their carapace width is up to 40 mm.

References

External links
 SeaFriends

Grapsoidea
Monotypic arthropod genera
Marine crustaceans of New Zealand
Crustaceans described in 1851